Haşim Kılıç (born 13 March 1950, in Çiçekdağı, Kırşehir) was a high-ranked judge and the President of the Constitutional Court of Turkey from 22 October 2007 until 10 February 2015.

Kılıç was born in Hacı Hasanlı village of Çiçekdağı district of the Kırşehir Province in Turkey. In 1968 he attended Eskişehir Academy of Economics and Commerce and graduated in 1972. Between 1974 and 1985, he served as a financial auditor at the Court of Auditors of Turkey, which is a high judicial body according to the Constitution of Turkey. He was elected as a member of the Board of the Court of Auditors of Turkey, a position he held five years long.

On 7 December 1990, he was appointed as a judge of the Constitutional Court by Turkish President Turgut Özal. On 7 December 1999 and 7 December 2003, he was elected twice as the deputy president of the court. On February 10, 2015, he announced his retirement, a month ahead of schedule, after a series of public confrontations between himself and top government officials. He was succeeded by Zühtü Arslan.

He is married to Gönül Kılıç. The couple has four children.

References

External links
 His page on the Constitutional Court's Web site 

1950 births
Living people
People from Çiçekdağı
Turkish civil servants
Turkish economists
Turkish judges
Presidents of the Constitutional Court of Turkey